Distant Close is a 2022 Russian road comedy drama film directed by Ivan Sosnin, theatrically released on 29 September 2022.

Plot
The film tells of a geography teacher at a Khabarovsk school who lives a routine life and gradually moves away from his son Misha. Everything changes when Misha decides to give his dad his old smartphone, as a result of which, the father begins to register on social media networks.

Cast and characters
 Ekaterina Ageyeva as Masha
 Filipp Avdeyev as Misha
 Kirill Käro as trucker
 Irina Pegova as Natalya Pavlovna
 Evgeniy Sytyy as Boris
 Andrey Urgant as Vova
 Elena Yakovleva as Nadezhda
 Dmitry Lysenkov as director
 Sofiya Suchkova as Masha's friend
 Andrei Blagoslovensky as neighbor

References

External links
 

2022 films
2020s road comedy-drama films
2020s Russian-language films
Russian road comedy-drama films